Burshtyn is a city located in Ivano-Frankivsk Oblast, in western Ukraine, to the north of Halych. It is accessible by rail. Burshtyn hosts the administration of Burshtyn urban hromada, one of the hromadas of Ukraine. Population: 

It developed rapidly and significantly grew in population during the Soviet period. Administratively, Burshtyn is incorporated as a city of regional significance.

The town, which was one of the Jewish shtetls, and whose name in Ukrainian and Polish literally means amber, was only granted city status in 1993 and has a special administrative status in Halych Raion. As an urbanized settlement from 1944 to 1962, it was the main town of the raion. There is an old Roman Catholic Church in the center of the city, which was restored at the beginning of the 21st century.

One of its landmarks is the Burshtyn TES coal-fired power station, which is situated on a reservoir approximately 8 km long and 2 km wide. A fish farm lies on the lake near the district of Bilshivtsi. The town is known for its soccer club Enerhetyk.

History

The first mention of this town was in a Halych history book from 1596, where it was referred to as Nove Selo (New village), although the town establishment dates back to 1554. In the second half of the 16th century, the town belonged to the Polish noble Skarbek. In October 1629, a famous battle took place near the city, in which the registered Cossacks and the crown army under the command of Stefan Chmielecki defeated the Tatar attackers led by Salamet-Geray, who were returning with loot from the Belz land. From 1630, the owner of Burshtyn was the tycoon Jabłonowski. during the Polish-Turkish wars of the 17th century (1629, 1675), the city was repeatedly destroyed by raids by Tatars and Turks.

In 1809, Franz Xaver Mozart, son of Wolfgang A. Mozart, lived in Burshtyn which at that time was part of the Austrian Empire. It was the center of Burshtyn District: until 1867, it was the administrative center, until 1919, it was the judicial center. On September 1, 1866, the first Lviv-Chernivtsi train passed through the Burshtyn station.

There is an old Jewish cemetery in Burshtyn, the only surviving testament of once thriving Jewish community in the city. In 1942, there were around 1,700 Jews residing in Burshtyn. German troops entered Burshtyn in July, but in a few weeks the Ukrainian militia were in control.  During that time, they initiated a pogrom against the Jews with many arrested, beaten, and robbed. Some Jewish leaders were gathered in the synagogue where they were humiliated, beaten, and had their beards shorn. Ukrainians drank and celebrated throughout the night, while Jews were beaten on the street and their properties looted. When the Germans took control, they established a ghetto and conscripted Jews for forced labor in the town and elsewhere. Jews were rounded up in September and October 1942.  Many were killed in the town by German security services and Ukrainian auxiliary police.  Most were sent to Belzec where they were immediately murdered or to the Rohatyn ghetto where they were later murdered or sent on to Belzec.

The Jewish cemetery was established in the 18th century with the last known Hasidic Jewish burial in the 1940s.

It was in Halych Raion until 11 March 2014. Subsequently, until 18 July 2020, Burshtyn was incorporated as a city of oblast significance and the center of Burshtyn Municipality. The municipality was abolished in July 2020 as part of the administrative reform of Ukraine, which reduced the number of raions of Ivano-Frankivsk Oblast to six. The area of Burshtyn Municipality was merged into the newly established Ivano-Frankivsk Raion.

Notable residents
 Mika Newton, Ukrainian pop singer and Eurovision participant
 Zdzislaw Adamczyk (1886–1940) – Colonel of the Polish Army, mayor of Zakopane, murdered by the NKVD in the Katyn massacre
 Ludwik Finkel – Polish historian, rector of the Lwow University
 Franz Xaver Wolfgang Mozart, Austrian composer lived in the town in 1809.

Gallery

See also
 Amber Road

References

Further reading

External links

 Ukrainian website dedicated to the city (with a number of photos).
 Photographs of Jewish sites in Burshtyn in Jewish History in Galicia and Bukovina at Jewish Galicia
 
Burshtyn Jewish Cemetery fully documented at Jewish Galicia and Bukovina ORG

 
Cities in Ivano-Frankivsk Oblast
Shtetls
Cities of regional significance in Ukraine
Holocaust locations in Ukraine